Zoi Katherine Sadowski-Synnott  (born 6 March 2001) is a New Zealand snowboarder, specialising in slopestyle and big air competitions. She won the gold medal in the women's slopestyle and silver in the big air at the 2022 Winter Olympics, becoming New Zealand's first gold medallist and first to win multiple medals at the Winter Olympics. She also won the bronze medal in the women's big air at the 2018 Winter Olympics, and won the women's slopestyle title at the 2019 World Championships.

Early life and family
Sadowski-Synnott was born in Sydney, New South Wales, Australia, to a New Zealand father, Sean Synnott, and an American mother, Robin Sadowski. She has four siblings. She initially grew up in the Sydney suburb of Newport before moving with her family to Wānaka, New Zealand, when she was six years old. She was educated at Mount Aspiring College.

Career
Sadowski-Synnott won the silver medal in the slopestyle at the 2017 FIS Snowboard World Championships.

She competed for New Zealand at the 2018 Winter Olympics in Pyeongchang, South Korea. She won the bronze medal in the women's big air, becoming only the second New Zealander to win a Winter Olympic medal, after Annelise Coberger who won silver in the women's slalom at the 1992 Winter Olympics. Her big air qualifying saw her become the first woman to successfully land a switch backside 900 (i.e. riding in unnatural stance and performing 2.5 rotations in the backside direction) in competition. She also competed in the women's slopestyle, finishing in 13th place.

At age 16 years 353 days, Sadowski-Synnott briefly became New Zealand's youngest ever Olympic medallist, breaking the previous record of 17 years 100 days set by Danyon Loader at the 1992 Summer Olympics. The record was broken later the same day by Nico Porteous at age 16 years 91 days. She was subsequently selected as New Zealand's flag bearer for the 2018 Winter Olympics closing ceremony, becoming the nation's youngest-ever flag bearer.

In January 2019, Sadowski-Synnott claimed the gold medal in the slopestyle event, and the silver in the big air, at the Winter X Games in Aspen, Colorado. A month later, she won the gold medal in the slopestyle at the 2019 FIS Snowboard World Championships.

In March 2019, she won the slopestyle event at the US Open in Vail, Colorado, completing the triple crown of the Open title, the X Games gold, and the World Championship title.

In March 2020, she claimed the gold medal in the slopestyle event at the Winter X Games in Hafjell.

In January 2021, she claimed the silver medal in the slopestyle event, and the bronze in the big air,  at the Winter X Games in Aspen, Colorado. Two months later, she won the gold medal in the slopestyle event at the 2021 FIS Snowboard World Championships.

In December 2021, Sadowski-Synnott claimed victory in the women’s snowboard slopestyle event at the invite-only Winter Dew Tour in Copper Mountain, Colorado. In January 2022, she finished second in the slopestyle event at the U.S. Grand Prix World Cup event in California, USA.

In January 2022, Sadowski-Synnott claimed the gold medal in both the slopestyle event and the big air event at the Winter X Games in Aspen, Colorado.

On 6 February 2022, Sadowski-Synnott won the gold medal in the slopestyle event at the Beijing 2022 Winter Olympics. This was New Zealand's first gold medal at the Winter Olympics. Sadowski-Synnott followed up her gold with a silver in the Big air, becoming the first New Zealander to win multiple medals at a Winter Olympics. She was subsequently awarded the Lonsdale Cup for 2022 by the New Zealand Olympic Committee. 

In the 2023 New Year Honours, Sadowski-Synnott was appointed a Member of the New Zealand Order of Merit, for services to snow sports. In January 2023, she successfully defended her gold medal in the slopestyle event at the Winter X Games in Aspen, Colorado. In February 2023, she claimed the silver medal in the slopestyle event at the 2023 FIS Snowboard World Championships.

International competitions

References

External links
Zoi Sadowski-Synnott at Snow Sports NZ

|-

|-

2001 births
Living people
New Zealand female snowboarders
Snowboarders at the 2018 Winter Olympics
Snowboarders at the 2022 Winter Olympics
Olympic snowboarders of New Zealand
Olympic gold medalists for New Zealand
Olympic silver medalists for New Zealand
Olympic bronze medalists for New Zealand
Medalists at the 2018 Winter Olympics
Medalists at the 2022 Winter Olympics
New Zealand people of American descent
New Zealand people of Polish descent
Australian people of New Zealand descent
Olympic medalists in snowboarding
Sportspeople from Sydney
People from Wānaka
X Games athletes
People educated at Mount Aspiring College
Members of the New Zealand Order of Merit